Champion Lakes may refer to:

 Champion Lakes, Western Australia, suburb of Perth, Western Australia
 Champion Lakes (Idaho), chain of lakes in Custer County, Idaho
 Champion Lakes Provincial Park, provincial park in the West Kootenay region of British Columbia, Canada